Leath Cuinn (Conn's Half) and Leath Moga (Mugh's half) are legendary ancient divisions of Ireland.

Leath Cuinn was the island north of the Esker Riada (east-west drumlin belt from Dublin to Galway Bay). Conn Cétchathach, for whom this division is named, was a retrospective ancestor of the Connachta and Uí Néill dynasties.

Ireland's legendary ancient division into Leath Cuinn (Conn's Half) and Leath Moga (Mugh's half) resulted from the battle of Maigh Nuadad in 123 A.D. Conn, defeated by Eoghan Mor (also known as Mug Nuadat), was forced to accede to the division of Ireland into two halves:

 The North - taking in Connacht, Ulster and Meath - would be Conn's Half
 The South - taking in Munster, Osraighe and Leinster - would be Eoghan's Half.

To solidify the arrangement, Conn's daughter, Sadhbh was married to Ailill Aulom, son of Eoghan.

The Eoganacht dynasty in Munster claimed, as descendants of Oiloill Olum, the historical right as overkings of Leath Moga (i.e. overlordship of Leinster as well as Munster) in the early medieval age, a claim disputed by the Uí Néill.

In the twelfth century, the north-south division of Ireland was used as a basis for the new division of dioceses in Ireland at the Synod of Ráth Breasail.

Annalistic references
See Annals of Inisfallen (AI)

 AI929.2 Repose of Tuathal, learned bishop of Leth Cuinn.

References
 Aubrey Gwynn, The Irish Church in the Eleventh and Twelfth Centuries, Gerard O'Brien (ed.) (Four Courts Press, 1992).
 Seaán Mór Ó Dubhagáin and Giolla-Na-Naomh Ó Huidhrín, Topographical Poems , James Carney (ed.) (Dublin Institute for Advanced Studies, 1943).

Irish legends
Ancient peoples
Geographic history of Ireland